Tom Coyne is an American writer and professor.  Coyne has published four books, A Gentleman's Game (2002), Paper Tiger (2007), A Course Called Ireland (2009) and A Course Called Scotland (2019). A Gentleman's Game was adapted into a full-length film starring Gary Sinise and Dylan Baker. After graduating from Archmere Academy, Coyne attended the University of Notre Dame, and then moved to Philadelphia, Pennsylvania, where he is now an English professor at Saint Joseph's University.

A Gentleman's Game

A novel about a young Timmy Price, who inspires jealousy at an exclusive golf club in Delaware.

Paper Tiger

Paper Tiger is a true story about Tom Coyne's journey into the world of professional golf. Coyne's odyssey would include leaving Philadelphia, Pennsylvania to live in Florida. Coyne would enlist the help of swing doctor Dr. Jim Suttie and go through rigorous weight training in preparation. Coyne would also seek sports psychologist Dr. Robert Winters to help fulfill his dream. Coyne would go from a 15 handicap to a plus, but would not play well enough to gain entrance to stage one of the PGA Tour's qualifying school. Coyne would play numerous mini-tour events, including a Nationwide Tour event, and play against teenage golfing phenomenon Michelle Wie in a Public Links qualifier.

A Course Called Ireland

Coyne's next project took him to the links courses of Ireland; not just to play some rounds but to play the country itself.  Coyne walked around the perimeter of the Republic and Northern Ireland, without the use of any transportation, playing the courses en route: 36 courses, 648 holes, over 2,000,000 yards.

The resulting book was published by Gotham Books, and released on February 19, 2009.

A Course Called Scotland

Coyne's fourth book was released in 2019 detailing his journey of more than 100 courses in the home of golf.

A Course Called America

Coyne's fifth book was released in 2021 detailing his journey of the United States to find the great American golf course.

External links
Tom Coyne
A Gentleman's Game
Paper Tiger
A Course Called Ireland
A Course Called Scotland

21st-century American novelists
University of Notre Dame alumni
Living people
Year of birth missing (living people)
Golf writers and broadcasters
American male novelists
21st-century American male writers